Maat is a Pakistani drama serial broadcast on Hum TV premiered on 9 September 2011. The drama is based on an Urdu novel of the same name by Umera Ahmad. Maat's last episode was telecasted on 24 February 2012. It is one of the highest-rated Pakistani television series.

Plot

Saman and Aiman are sisters who belong to a lower-middle-class family. Aiman the elder sister is kind, polite, and deeply respects her elders; Saman, who is younger than Aiman, is overambitious and believes she can give maat (defeat) to anyone at any time. Their cousin Faisal is enchanted with Saman's beauty and, despite his engagement to Aiman, proposes to Saman. She refuses, but his improving financial status changes her mind.

The marriage is uneasy due to Saman's demanding nature, but the couple have a son, whom they name Hadid. Saman can barely handle her child, so Aiman takes on the role of caretaker. Saman begins an affair with Faisal's business partner, Azar, who is richer than her husband. After an incident where Saman's attitude towards her mother-in-law leads Faisal to slap her, Saman files for divorce.

Around the same time, Azar breaks his partnership with Faisal. Leaving her family heartbroken, Saman enjoys her wealthy life with her new husband. Meanwhile, Aiman's mother and aunt decide to get Faisal and Aiman married so that Hadid will have a maternal figure in his life.

Twenty-five years later, Faisal has established a new factory and become a wealthy and successful businessman. Hadid has now grown up to be a successful 27-year-old bachelor. Unknown to Aiman, Faisal has begun an affair with Saman, again, after Azar's death. Faisal decides to end his marriage to Aiman and offers her a Apartment and monthly retainer so she won't need anything financially. He also lies to Aiman about Hadid wanting Saman back which causes a heartbroken Aiman to leave. Meanwhile, Saman remarries Faisal. Hadid, later discovers that Aiman has left and that Saman only returned because Azar has died. He reacts with outrage and accuses Saman of returning only because her former life is gone. He disowns her as well as his father. Hadid later brings Aiman home, although she is resistant at first, she realizes her adopted son was never at fault and his refusal to be a part of Faisal's plan is what delayed it for so long.

Four years later, Hadid has a wife and son with Aiman living with them. She receives a call from Saman, who apologizes on her and Faisal's behalf, having grown tired of their isolation. Aiman forgives them, but reminds Saman their misery was of her own making. With this, she hangs up, happy with the knowledge she finally gave maat to Saman, after all.

Cast 
 Aamina Sheikh as Aiman
 Saba Qamar as Saman
 Adnan Siddiqui as Faisal
 Noor Hassan Rizvi as Hadeed 
 Shamim Hilaly as Faisal's mother
 Rabia Noreen as Afia
 Asad Malik as Aazar
 Samina Ahmad as servant
 Maheen Rizvi as Shaila
 Sadia Ghaffar as Munazzah

Broadcast and release

National and international broadcast
Maat was originally broadcast on Hum TV. It was rebroadcast by Hum TV due to its popularity and viewers demand in September 2013. Also aired on Hum Sitaray and with Pashto dubbing on Hum Pashto 1.

It was also aired in Iran and Turkey under the same title, premiering on 19 July 2014. The show ended its run in Iran on 12 August 2014. It has again been shown three more times in Turkey due to its popularity. In UK and Ireland, the show was aired on Rishtey tv UK (now Colors Rishtey UK) and first episode was aired on 10 August 2013. In India, it was aired on Zindagi TV premiering 19 July 2014 at 08:00pm by replacing channel most popular Zindagi Gulzar Hai.

Digital release and availability
The show was made available to stream online on MX Player. Since mid-2020 it is also available on ZEE5 and Hum TV's official YouTube channel.

Accolades

References

External links
 Official Website
 Maat on MX Player
 Maat on ZEE5

2011 Pakistani television series debuts
Pakistani drama television series
Hum TV original programming
2012 Pakistani television series endings
Urdu-language telenovelas
Pakistani telenovelas
Zee Zindagi original programming